Freyja is a goddess in Norse mythology.

Freyja may also refer to:

, a Moldovan chemical tanker formerly known as MV Freyja
 ICGV Freyja,an offshore patrol vessel of the Icelandic 
 Freyja, British band of which Jo Freya is a member
 Freyja, a given name

See also
 Freia (disambiguation)
 Freja (disambiguation)
 Freya (disambiguation)
 Frøya (disambiguation)